"In Jeopardy" is a song by Roger Hodgson, released in 1984 as the second single from his debut solo album In the Eye of the Storm. It peaked at number 30 on the Billboard Mainstream Rock chart.

Charts

References

1984 songs
1984 singles
Roger Hodgson songs
Songs written by Roger Hodgson
A&M Records singles